The Chagatai Turks are people who descended from the Chagatai Khanate.

It may refer to:

Chagatai Khanate
Chagatai Khan
Chagatai people
Chughtai

See also 
 Chagatai (disambiguation)